The 2. Hannoversches Infanterie-Regiment Nr. 77 (77th [2nd Hanoverian] Infantry Regiment) was an infantry regiment in the Prussian Army (1867 to 1871) and Imperial German Army (1871 to 1918).

Notable Members
Georg von Kameke, General of the Infantry, Prussian Minister of War (Colonel-in-Chief)

See also
List of Imperial German infantry regiments

References
 Becker, ----- Schlachten und Gefechte des 2. Hannoverschen Infanterie-Regiments Nr. 77 im Weltkriege 1914/18. Celle: Selbstverlag, 1923.
 v. Conrady, Emil K. Die Geschichte des 2. Hannoverschen Infanterie-Regiments Nr 77: Die ersten 25 J. 1866 bis 1891. Berlin: E. S. Mittler & Sohn, 1892. (2. Auflg., 1894)
 Dorndorf, Georg. Geschichte des 2. hannoverschen Infanterie-Regiments Nr 77; Teil 1: Die hannoverschen Überliefergn. Berlin: Bath, 1903.
 [Dorndorf, Georg ?] Abriss der Geschichte des 2. Hannoverschen Infanterie-Regiments Nr 77 und seiner Ueberlieferungen aus Hannoverscher Zeit 1813-1903. Berlin: Bath, 1904.
 Lau, M. Kurzer Abriss der Geschichte des 2. hannoverschen Infanterie-Regiments Nr 77. Berlin: E. S. Mittler & Sohn, 1882.
 Schimmelpfeng, Hans. Geschichte des 2. Hannoverschen Infanterie-Regiments Nr 77 (1866-1913). Oldenburg: Stalling, 1913.
 Schwencke, Georg. Offizier-Stammliste des 2. Hannoverschen Infanterie-Regiments Nr 77. Oldenburg: Stalling, 1913.
 Viereck, Helmut. Das Heideregiment Königlich Preußisches 2. Hannoversches Infanterie-Regiment Nr 77 im Weltkriege 1914-1918. Celle: A. Pohl, 1934.

Infantry regiments of the Prussian Army